Kelvin Spencer Pires (born 5 June 2000) is a Cape Verdean footballer who plays for AS Trenčín in the Fortuna Liga as a centre back.

Club career

AS Trenčín
Pires made his Fortuna Liga debut for AS Trenčín against FC Spartak Trnava on 6 March 2021.

International career
Pires made his debut with the Cape Verde national team in a 2022 FIFA World Cup qualification home fixture with Nigeria on 4 September 2021. He was featured in the starting-XI and completed the entirety of the match. Cape Verde lost 1–2.

References

External links
 AS Trenčín official club profile 
 Futbalnet profile 
 
 

2000 births
Living people
Cape Verdean footballers
Cape Verdean expatriate footballers
Cape Verde international footballers
Association football defenders
Batuque FC players
AS Trenčín players
Slovak Super Liga players
Cape Verdean expatriate sportspeople in Slovakia
Expatriate footballers in Slovakia